Anna Mikusheva (Анна Евгеньевна Микушева; born April 29, 1976) is the Professor of Economics at Massachusetts Institute of Technology. She was the 2012 recipient of the Elaine Bennett Research Prize, a bi-annual prize that recognizes and celebrates research by a woman in the field of Economics, and was selected as a Sloan Research Fellow in 2013. She is a co-editor of the journal Econometric Theory.

Early life and education
Mikusheva grew up in Orenburg, Russia. She studied at Moscow State University, where she earned an undergraduate degree in mathematics in 1998. In 2001, she completed a  PhD in probability theory, and simultaneously earned an MA at the New Economic School.  In 2007, she completed a PhD in economics at Harvard University, specializing in time series econometrics.

2007-2012 Assistant Professor of Economics, Massachusetts Institute of Technology.

2012-2022 Associate Professor of Economics.

July 2022- Professor of Economics.

Career
Mikusheva's current research focuses on developing tools to address the estimation of sophisticated macroeconomic models—such as dynamic stochastic general equilibrium (DSGE) models—with the limited amounts of economic data available.  Her methods show where estimation of such models is more and less reliable, especially in the case of weakly identified instruments.

Recognition
2013- Sloan Research Fellowship
2012- Elaine Bennett Research Prize

Selected works

References 

American women economists
Russian women economists
21st-century American economists
Econometricians
Women statisticians
MIT School of Humanities, Arts, and Social Sciences faculty
1976 births
Living people
Moscow State University alumni
New Economic School alumni
Harvard University alumni
Russian emigrants to the United States
Fellows of the Econometric Society
Academic journal editors
21st-century American women